Ines Steffens is the editor-in-chief of Eurosurveillance. She succeeded Karl Ekdahl in this role in 2011.

Career
She joined Eurosurveillance as managing editor in 2006 and became editor-in-chief in 2011. She spoke on behalf of Eurosurveillance at the 2015 International Conference on Emerging Infectious Diseases.

Steffens is a member of the editorial board of the European Food Safety Authority's journal. She was a member of the European Association of Science Editors Gender Policy Committee and the peer review committee in 2017. In addition, she was a member of the associations programme committee for the 2020 conference 
 where she presented a virtual talk on how the COVID-19 pandemic had affected Eurosurveillance

Education
Steffens studied medicine at University of Mainz, graduating in 1994.

References

Year of birth missing (living people)
Living people
German women scientists
Robert Koch Institute people
Johannes Gutenberg University Mainz alumni
Medical journal editors
German epidemiologists